Charles W. Brouse (December 30, 1839 – October 26, 1904) was an American soldier who received the Medal of Honor for valor during the American Civil War.

Biography
Brouse was commissioned as a Captain of Company K, 100th Regiment, Indiana Volunteer Infantry on September 24, 1862, and was discharged due to disability on January 16, 1865. He received the Medal of Honor on May 16, 1899, for his actions at the Battle of Missionary Ridge, Tennessee, on November 25, 1863.

Medal of Honor citation
Citation:

 To encourage his men whom he had ordered to lie down while under severe fire, and who were partially protected by slight earthworks, himself refused to lie down, but walked along the top of the works until he fell severely wounded.

See also

List of American Civil War Medal of Honor recipients: A-F

References

External links
Military Times

1839 births
1904 deaths
Union Army officers
United States Army Medal of Honor recipients
People of Indiana in the American Civil War
American Civil War recipients of the Medal of Honor